Verkhny Yeruslan is a rural locality (a selo) in Kanovskoye Rural Settlement, Staropoltavsky District, Volgograd Oblast, Russia. The population was 511 as of 2010. There are 5 streets.

Geography 
Verkhny Yeruslan is located in steppe, on the left bank of the Yeruslan River, 6 km northeast of Staraya Poltavka (the district's administrative centre) by road. Staraya Poltavka is the nearest rural locality.

References 

Rural localities in Staropoltavsky District